Iresh (Bengali: ইরেশ) is an Asian masculine given name that may refer to the following notable people:
Iresh Chamara (born 1994), Sri Lankan cricketer
Iresh Saxena (born 1984), Bangladeshi cricketer
Iresh Zaker (born 1976), Bangladeshi advertising executive, television and film actor and a musician

Bangladeshi masculine given names
Sinhalese masculine given names